Salvador de Alba Jr. (born 11 December 2000) is a Mexican racing driver who competes full-time in the Indy Pro 2000 Championship, driving for Jay Howard Driver Development. He is the 2021 NASCAR PEAK Mexico Series champion.

Racing record

Career summary

American open–wheel racing results

Indy Pro 2000 Championship

*Season still in progress.

References

External links
 
 

2000 births
Living people
Mexican racing drivers
Formula 4 drivers
Indy Pro 2000 Championship drivers
NASCAR drivers